Jang Jung-hee (born June 20, 1958), is a South Korean actress. She mostly plays supporting roles in television dramas.

Filmography

Television drama

Film

References

External links

1958 births
Living people
South Korean television actresses
South Korean film actresses
21st-century South Korean actresses